Alexandra Hawkins is an American author of historical romance novels.

Two of her books, After Dark with a Scoundrel and Sunrise with a Notorious Lord, made the USA Today best-selling books list.

Bibliography
Waiting For An Earl Like You, 2017

Lords of Vice
 All Night with a Rogue, 2010
 Till Dawn with the Devil, 2010
 After Dark with a Scoundrel, 2011
 Sunrise with a Notorious Lord, 2012
 All Afternoon with a Scandalous Marquess, 2012
 Dusk with a Dangerous Duke, 2013
 Twilight with the Infamous Earl, 2013

Masters of Seduction
 A Duke but No Gentleman, 2015
 You Can't Always Get the Marquess You Want, 2016

Anthologies
 Christmas Brides, 2014

References

External links
Official website

21st-century American novelists
American romantic fiction writers
American women novelists
Year of birth missing (living people)
Living people
21st-century American women writers